Sacred Heart University (SHU) is a private, Roman Catholic university in Fairfield, Connecticut. It was founded in 1963 by Walter W. Curtis, Bishop of the Diocese of Bridgeport, Connecticut. Sacred Heart was the first Catholic university in the United States to be staffed by the laity.

Sacred Heart is the second-largest Catholic university in New England, behind Boston College, and offers more than 80 degree programs to over 8,500 students at the bachelor's, master's and doctoral levels.

History
Sacred Heart University was founded in 1963 by Walter W. Curtis, Bishop of the Diocese of Bridgeport on the grounds of the former Notre Dame Catholic High School. The university is led and staffed by the laity independent and locally oriented. The founding president was William H. Conley (1907–1974). Former American ambassador and Diplomat Thomas Patrick Melady served as president of the university from 1976 to 1986.

Enrollment has risen from the original class of 173 to over 8,500 full and part-time undergraduate and graduate students, and the faculty has increased from 9 to 281 full-time professors and over 520 adjunct professors since 1963.

In 1990, Sacred Heart built the first dorms, and began accepting residential. It now has 10 residential buildings with 50 percent of the full-time undergraduates residing in university housing.

The university has 32 varsity teams that compete in Division I. In 1997, The William H. Pitt Health and Recreation Center was opened.

In 1981, then-United States vice president George H. W. Bush received an honorary degree from Sacred Heart.

In 2006, Jack Welch, former CEO of General Electric, made a financial gift to the university and College of Business was named after him.

In recent years, Sacred Heart University has purchased land in the surrounding Fairfield, Connecticut area, and has built new academic buildings, dormitories, and in January of 2023 completed construction of the hockey rink.

Recent history 
On September 27, 2009, Sacred Heart University opened the Chapel of the Holy Spirit.

In 2010, Sacred Heart announced plans to open a new Health and Wellness Center. The center was built on Park Avenue across from the main campus.

In 2012, the university opened a new student commons building, named the Linda E. McMahon Student Commons, after McMahon donated $5 million to the university. The new Commons includes dining facilities, lounge space, and a bookstore.

In 2014, Sacred Heart broke ground for a new learning center, called the Student Success Center. The center provides educational support for students at the university and from the surrounding region. In 2015, the university started construction of the Center for Healthcare Education.

In 2015, the university opened the Frank and Marisa Martire Center for Business & Communications building, which houses the Jack Welch College of Business and the School of Communication & Media Arts. The building was designed Sasaki Associates, who also designed the Linda E. McMahon Student Commons.

In 2016, Sacred Heart opened a new residence hall, called Bergoglio Hall, named after Pope Francis, whose birth name is Jorge Bergoglio.

In October 2016, Nikki Yovino reported to the police that she was raped by two black Sacred Heart University football players at an off-campus party. Yovino has admitted, months later, that the sexual assault was a lie in an attempt to gain the attention of another man. However, in 2018, she pled guilty to two counts of second-degree falsely reporting an incident and one count of interfering with police and was sentenced to one year in jail and three years of probation. The men Yovino accused, Malik St. Hilaire and Dhameer Bradley, were forced out of Sacred Heart University after losing their scholarships amid the false accusations. As of August 27, 2018, both men are no longer enrolled at Sacred Heart University and with no remediation for losing their scholarships.

In November 2016, Sacred Heart acquired the former GE corporate headquarters located near its main campus.

In April 2017, Sacred Heart and St. Vincent's College, another Catholic college in Connecticut, agreed to merge management operations. In 2018, the schools' merger was completed and St. Vincent's became known as St. Vincent's College at Sacred Heart University.

In 2019, Sacred Heart was ranked on Princeton Reviews list of best schools, including tenth for "Happiest Students". In 2020, Sacred Heart announced plans to build a $60 million hockey arena.

Academics 
The university consists of five colleges: College of Arts & Sciences, which includes the School of Communication & Media Arts and the School of Computing; Jack Welch College of Business and Technology; College of Health Professions; College of Nursing and the Isabelle Farrington College of Education. Sacred Heart University is accredited by the New England Commission of Higher Education.

Sacred Heart University offers more than 80 bachelor's, master's, and doctoral programs. Sacred Heart also offers qualified undergraduates the opportunity to complete an undergraduate degree and a graduate degree with five to six years depending on the degree program.

In 2012, the university ranked as America's least affordable university in a Newsweek ranking.

Campus

Additional campuses
 Center for Healthcare Education (Bridgeport, Connecticut)
 West Campus (Fairfield, Connecticut)
 Stamford Campus (Stamford, Connecticut)
 Griswold Campus (Griswold, Connecticut)
 Dingle, County Kerry Campus (Ireland)
 WSHU Broadcast Center (Fairfield, Connecticut)

Media 
Sacred Heart University owns and operates both WSHU-FM and WSHU-AM, NPR-affiliated radio stations broadcasting out of Fairfield, Connecticut.

Student life

Theatre Arts Program
The Theatre Arts Program began in 2009, with the premiere of Sacred Heart University's first musical production: Rent. Other productions have included Little Shop of Horrors in 2011, The 25th Annual Putnam County Spelling Bee in 2013, Sweeney Todd: The Demon Barber of Fleet Street in 2015, and Jesus Christ Superstar in 2017.

The Sacred Heart Theatre Arts program (“TAP”) Produces 6 full scale productions a year. Two which are performed on the Edgerton main stage, and four in the black box Little Theater.

The Theatre Arts Program has a student-produced, student-written, and student-performed festival called "Theatrefest". The program also has an improv team called The Pioneer Players. In 2016, the program began its own Repertory Theatre Company. Students are invited into this exclusive company beginning after their first semester. In 2017, Sacred Heart expanded its Theatre Arts Program by launching its National Playwriting Competition & Intern Program.

Student government
The Student Government consists of student leaders from all four class years. All full-time undergraduate students have the opportunity to be elected or appointed to a position.

The Spectrum
The Spectrum is a student-run newspaper printed and distributed to students each Wednesday and made available online.

Community service
More than 1,200 students and members of the faculty and staff volunteer in excess of 31,000 hours each year largely within the City of Bridgeport, but also regionally, nationally, and internationally. The work of the Office of Volunteer Programs & Service Learning is at the heart of the overall mission of the university. The programs offered allow students to engage in the local community and in communities around the world. Nearly all of the programs are organized by student leaders who grow their leadership and professional skills as they work with community partners. There are weekly volunteer opportunities to local schools, soup kitchens and food banks, and senior centers. Students interested in a long-term weekly volunteer commitment can participate in a mentoring program, where Sacred Heart University students work one-on-one with local Bridgeport students. The office also provides immersion programs and experiences.

Study abroad
Sacred Heart Universtiy has a residential study-abroad program in the Irish-speaking community of Dingle, County Kerry, Ireland. International experiences are available to students worldwide through programs located at The American University of Rome, in Italy, the University of Notre Dame in Fremantle, Australia, and the University of Granada, in Spain, as well as programs in Bermuda and the Bahamas.

The university allows students to participate in CCIS programs, programs affiliated with other schools across the U.S. These programs include, but are not limited to: France, Argentina, Germany, Belgium, and Japan.

Athletics

The Pioneers compete in Division I of the National Collegiate Athletic Association (NCAA) in the Northeast Conference (NEC), Atlantic Hockey, the New England Women's Hockey Alliance (NEWHA), Eastern College Athletic Conference (ECAC), the Metro Atlantic Athletic Conference (MAAC), Eastern Intercollegiate Wrestling Association (EIWA), and the Eastern Intercollegiate Volleyball Association (EIVA). The NEC is the school's primary conference.

Nearly 800 students participate in the university's 32 athletic teams (18 female teams and 14 male teams) along with more than 500 students who participate in 23 Club Sports.
The football team plays at the Football Championship Subdivision level and claims an FCS title in 2001.  Their biggest rivalry is with the oldest public university in Connecticut, Central Connecticut State University, in what has been dubbed the Constitution State Rivalry.

The men's fencing team won the Northeast Conference title five years in a row (2010–2014) and was ranked #9 in 2011.

On February 21, 2013, the Sacred Heart University athletics department hired longtime Major League Baseball player and manager Bobby Valentine as the athletic director.

On June 8, 2021, the Sacred Heart University athletics department named Judy Ann Riccio as its interim athletic director, replacing Bobby Valentine who took a leave of absence.

The men's ice hockey program competes in the Atlantic Hockey conference.

The women's ice hockey program had competed as in independent from 2003 to 2019 at the National Collegiate level, with "National Collegiate" being the NCAA's official designation for championship events in sports in which members of Divisions I and II compete for a single national title. The Pioneers participate in the NEWHA, established in 2017–18 by Sacred Heart, fellow Division I member Holy Cross, and four Division II schools. Sacred Heart won the inaugural NEWHA tournament title in 2018. The NEWHA lost Holy Cross to Hockey East after that season, but returned to 6 members for 2019–20 with the arrival of LIU, a fellow NEC member that launched a new women's program. With the NEWHA soon to have the membership total required for an automatic bid to the NCAA women's tournament, the NEWHA formally organized as a conference in 2018, and received official NCAA recognition effective with LIU's arrival in 2019–20.

Women's wrestling will become a varsity sport in 2021, the second for a Division I institution and first in the Northeast.

Greek life
Sacred Heart is home to nine national sororities, five national fraternities, one local fraternity, and two professional fraternities. Greek Life is one of the largest and fastest growing organizations on campus. Greek Life at the university is home to a chapter of Order of Omega, a national Greek academic honor society.

Sororities:

9 National:
 Alpha Delta Pi (Theta Rho chapter)
 Chi Omega (Kappa Mu chapter)
 Delta Delta Delta (Epsilon Psi chapter) 
 Delta Zeta (Pi Tau chapter)
 Kappa Alpha Theta (Theta Pi chapter) 
 Kappa Delta (Eta Nu chapter)
 Phi Sigma Sigma (Iota Nu chapter)
 Theta Phi Alpha (Gamma Rho chapter)
 Zeta Tau Alpha (Lambda Alpha chapter)

Fraternities:

4 National:
Beta Theta Pi (Colony)
Delta Tau Delta (Iota Tau chapter) 
 Kappa Sigma (Pi Omega chapter)
 Pi Kappa Phi (Iota Alpha chapter)

1 Local:
 Omega Phi Kappa
2 Professional:
 Alpha Kappa Psi (Chi Mu chapter)
 Kappa Kappa Psi (Lambda Nu chapter)

Sacred Heart University started out with several local Sororities and Fraternities, which included:

Sororities:
 Beta Delta Phi
 Gamma Phi Delta
 Nu Epsilon Omega
 Pi Sigma Phi

Fraternities:
 Delta Phi Omega
 Gamma Chi Zeta
 Lambda Sigma Phi
 Kreuzfahrer
 Pi Delta
 Rho Kappa Phi
 Rho Sigma Chi
 Sigma Eta Upsilon
 Sigma Psi Delta
 Sigma Tau Omega

Notable alumni
Arts and Entertainment
Drew Denbaum - writer, actor, director, and educator
Lydia Hearst-Shaw – model and actress
Jeff LeBlanc – singer/songwriter
Kevin Nealon – actor, Saturday Night Live cast member
John Ratzenberger – actor
Romeo Roselli – professional wrestler and actor

Business
Suzanne Greco - former president and CEO of Subway
Brian Hamilton - American entrepreneur and philanthropist and co-founder of Sageworks
Jenna Sanz-Agero - former lead singer of Vixen and currently Director of Business, Legal Affairs, and Strategic Knowledge Management at Netflix

Government and Law
Pat Boyd – Connecticut State Representative
Thomas W. Bucci - 49th Mayor of Bridgeport, Connecticut
Ramón Colón-López, USAF - fourth Senior Enlisted Advisor to the Chairman of the Joint Chiefs of Staff
Carl Higbie – left after September 11 to join the Navy SEALs.
Carlo Leone – Connecticut State Senator
Kathleen McCarty - Connecticut State Representative
Douglas McCrory - Connecticut State Senator
Richard A. Moccia - former Mayor of Norwalk, Connecticut
Michael Pavia - businessman and former mayor of Stamford, Connecticut
Felipe Reinoso - former Connecticut State Representative and political candidate for the Congress of the Republic of Peru
Gary Turco - Connecticut State Representative

Sports
Mark Nofri - head coach of the Sacred Heart Pioneers football team
Adam Fuller - The defensive coordinator at Florida State University for the  Florida State Seminoles football team
Keith Bennett (born 1961) - former professional American-Israeli basketball player
Ginny Capicchioni - former professional lacrosse player
Jon Corto – former professional football player for the Buffalo Bills
DeVeren Johnson - former professional football player for the Dallas Cowboys
Matt Jones – former professional soccer player
Troy Scribner - former professional baseball player for the Los Angeles Angels and the Arizona Diamondbacks
Gordon Hill - former professional football player for the Los Angeles Chargers
Justin Danforth - professional hockey player for the Columbus Blue Jackets
Zack Short - professional baseball player for the Detroit Tigers
Jason Foley - professional baseball player for the Detroit Tigers
Julius Chestnut - professional football player for the Tennessee Titans
Josh Sokol - professional football player for the Minnesota Vikings

Notable members of the board of trustees
Brian Hamilton
Patrick Maggitti
Linda McMahon

See also
 Film and Television Master's program at Sacred Heart University

References

External links
 
 Sacred Heart Athletics website

 
Buildings and structures in Fairfield, Connecticut
Association of Catholic Colleges and Universities
Educational institutions established in 1963
Roman Catholic Diocese of Bridgeport
Universities and colleges in Fairfield County, Connecticut
1963 establishments in Connecticut
Catholic universities and colleges in Connecticut
Census-designated places in Fairfield County, Connecticut
Census-designated places in Connecticut